Romario Garfield Williams (born 15 August 1994) is a Jamaican professional footballer who plays as a forward for USL Championship side Colorado Springs Switchbacks. He is named after the legendary Brazilian footballer, Romário.

Club career

Youth
Williams graduated from Kingston College in Jamaica and then attended university in Orlando. He played college soccer at the University of Central Florida. With the UCF Knights men's soccer program, Williams recorded 18 goals and five assists in 51 games, 46 as starter. He was a unanimous selection to the American Athletic Conference all-conference first team in 2014. He was also the 2013 American Athletic Conference Player of the Year.

Professional
Williams was selected by Montreal Impact third overall in the 2015 MLS SuperDraft on 15 January 2015. He made his professional debut on 28 March 2015 in a 2–2 draw against Orlando City SC.

On 11 December 2016 Atlanta United FC acquired Williams from the Impact in exchange for a third-round selection in the 2018 MLS SuperDraft.  On 7 April 2018, he scored his first career MLS goal in a 5–0 rout of Los Angeles FC.

On 1 July 2019, Williams was traded to Columbus Crew SC in exchange for $100,000 of General Allocation Money. After one season with the crew, Williams joined Miami FC of the USL Championship in January 2020.

In December 2020 Williams moved abroad to Egypt and joined Al Ittihad of the Egyptian Premier League. On 16 August 2021, Williams moved abroad to Kuwait and joined Qadsia SC of the Kuwait Premier League.

In July, 2022 Williams signed a contract with USL Championship side New Mexico United

Williams signed with the Colorado Springs Switchbacks on January 5, 2023.

International career
Williams has represented the U-17 level of the Jamaica national U-17 team, playing in three games at the 2011 U17 FIFA World Cup. He had previously started four of five games at the CONCACAF qualifiers. Romario also played the Jamaica U-23 national team in March 2015. Williams made his Jamaica senior national team debut in a 1–0 Caribbean Cup qualify win over Suriname on 13 November 2016.

Personal
He was named after Romário, Brazilian football legend who won the 1994 FIFA World Cup a month before he was born.

In February 2018 Williams received a U.S. green card which qualifies him as a domestic player for MLS roster purposes.

Career statistics

Club

International

Scores and results list Jamaica's goal tally first.

Honors
Jamaica
CONCACAF Gold Cup Runner-up: 2017

Atlanta United
 MLS Cup
 Winners: 2018
 Eastern Conference
 Winners : 2018

UCF
AAC Offensive Player of the Year: 2013

References

External links
 
 
 UCF profile

1994 births
Living people
Jamaican footballers
Jamaica international footballers
Jamaican expatriate footballers
UCF Knights men's soccer players
Orlando City U-23 players
CF Montréal players
FC Montreal players
Charleston Battery players
Atlanta United FC players
Atlanta United 2 players
Columbus Crew players
Miami FC players
Qadsia SC players
New Mexico United players
Colorado Springs Switchbacks FC players
Association football forwards
Expatriate soccer players in the United States
Expatriate soccer players in Canada
CF Montréal draft picks
USL League Two players
Major League Soccer players
USL Championship players
Kuwait Premier League players
2017 CONCACAF Gold Cup players
Al Ittihad Alexandria Club players
Expatriate footballers in Egypt
Expatriate footballers in Kuwait
Jamaican expatriate sportspeople in the United States
Jamaican expatriate sportspeople in Canada
Jamaican expatriate sportspeople in Kuwait
Jamaican expatriate sportspeople in Egypt
People from Saint Catherine Parish